The 2005–06 Elitserien was the 72nd season of the top division of Swedish handball. 14 teams competed in the league. The eight highest placed teams qualified for the playoffs, whereas teams 11–12 had to play relegation playoffs against teams from the second division, and teams 13–14 were relegated automatically. IK Sävehof won the regular season, but Hammarby IF won the playoffs and claimed their first Swedish title.

League table

Playoffs bracket 

An asterisk (*) denotes result after extra time

References 

Swedish handball competitions